Valentin Porte (born 7 September 1990) is a French handball player for Montpellier Handball and the French national team.

He won the European title in 2014, the world title in 2015 and 2017, and an Olympic gold medal in 2020. He also won EHF Champions League in 2018 with Montpellier.

References

External links

1990 births
Living people
French male handball players
Sportspeople from Versailles, Yvelines
Olympic handball players of France
Handball players at the 2016 Summer Olympics
Medalists at the 2016 Summer Olympics
Olympic silver medalists for France
Olympic medalists in handball
Montpellier Handball players
Handball players at the 2020 Summer Olympics
Medalists at the 2020 Summer Olympics
Olympic gold medalists for France